Tipton County Courthouse may refer to:

Tipton County Courthouse (Tipton, Indiana)
Tipton County Courthouse (Covington, Tennessee), courthouse of Tipton County, Tennessee